David A. Sleet is an American scientist recognized for championing the application of behavioral science to unintentional injury prevention and helping to establish injury prevention as a global public health concern. He has published hundreds of articles and book chapters and was co-editor of the Handbook of Injury and Violence Prevention.; Injury and Violence Prevention: Behavioral Science Theories; Derryberry’s Educating for Health; and the international prize-winning World Report on Road Traffic Injury Prevention.

Career
In 2016, Dr. Sleet retired from the Centers for Disease Control and Prevention (CDC) in Atlanta, Georgia where he served as the Associate Director for Science in the Division of Unintentional Injury Prevention in the National Center for Injury Prevention and Control. He concurrently served as an adjunct professor at the Emory University Rollins School of Public Health. Before joining CDC, Dr. Sleet taught and conducted research at San Diego State University, directed the Road Accident Research Unit at the University of Western Australia, and worked as a visiting scientist at the United States Department of Transportation  and the VTT (the Road Safety Agency) of Finland.

Dr. Sleet served on a systematic review team that led to a Community Preventive Services Task Force recommendation to lower the legal blood alcohol content (BAC) limit to 0.08 percent for drivers in the United States. This recommendation helped inform the U.S. Congress which mandated states adopt the stricter BAC limit of 0.08 percent by October 2003 or risk losing a portion of their highway funding. By 2004 all 50 states had passed 0.08 percent  laws for drivers, making it the new national standard.

Awards
Dr. Sleet has received numerous public health awards including the following:
 2015 Elizabeth Fries Health Education Award
 American Public Health Association (APHA) Derryberry Award for contributions to theory
 United States Department of Health and Human Services Secretary’s Award for Distinguished Service
 Mothers Against Drunk Driving (MADD) President’s Award
 APHA Distinguished Career in Injury Prevention
 Society for Public Health Education (SOPHE) Distinguished Fellow Award
 Centers for Disease Control and Prevention outstanding career award in behavioral science
 The Royal Order of Sahametrei Medal for service to the King and people of Cambodia 
 Fellow of the American Academy of Health Behavior (inducted 1999).

Public service
He has served on the following editorial boards:
 American Journal of Lifestyle Medicine
 Family and Community Health
 Health Behavior & Policy Review 
 Health Promotion Journal of Australia
 Health Promotion Practice 
 Injury Prevention
 International Journal of Education Research
 International Journal of Injury Control and Safety Promotion
 Journal of Comparative Effectiveness Research
 Journal of Pediatric Psychology
 Journal of Safety Research
 Journal of Social Behavior and Personality 
 Journal of Sports Medicine and Physical Fitness 
 Transportation Research Foundation: Traffic Psychology & Behavior

References

Centers for Disease Control and Prevention people
Emory University faculty
Year of birth missing (living people)
Living people
San Diego State University faculty
University of Toledo alumni